The University of Eastern Philippines is a public university in the Philippines. The university is the only comprehensive state university in Eastern Visayas, offering the largest number of undergraduate and graduate degree programs and short-term courses and certificates among the higher education institutions in the region. Its flagship campus is in Catarman, Northern Samar. The University of Eastern Philippines is the first State University in the Visayas.

History

The University of Eastern Philippines began as the Catarman Farm School (CFS) in September 1918 in a 516-hectare site of forested mountains and rice fields facing the Pacific Ocean. Then Governor Clodualdo Lucero proposed and sought the approval of the Provincial Board for the establishment of the school.

Its first principal was Washington Wiren from Maine, USA. He was succeeded by Filipino graduates from American agricultural institutions.  Dr. Felipe O. Cevallos from Bicol became the first Filipino principal, followed by Pedro Montellano who was on special detail from the Department of Agricultural Education, College of Agriculture, UP in 1923, and by Sabino Q. Ami who opened the secondary Home Economics curriculum in 1930.  Agapito Buenaventura came next and was succeeded by Eulogio Acuňa whose term was interrupted by the war in 1941.

The CFS was later named Catarman Agricultural School (CAS), which was proposed by Representative Pedro Mendiola of Catarman, raising its status to Insular Provincial, and subsequently making it the Catarman Agricultural High School (CAHS).

In 1946 Congressman Agripino Escareal and Senate President Jose Avelino Sr. worked for the complete nationalization of the school.  Thus in 1950 the school's name was once more changed to the Catarman National Agricultural High School (CNAHS).

With the rapid growth of knowledge and the urgent call for scientific and technological involvement of schools in rebuilding a nation, Samar Congressman Eladio Balite of Bobon, Northern Samar sponsored House Bill 6559 creating the Samar Institute of Technology (SIT), which Pres. Carlos P. Garcia signed into R.A. 1434.  With Senators Gil Puyat and Decoroso Rosales and Congressman Balite, SIT was inaugurated on September 7, 1958.  The first and only President of SIT was Colonel Emeterio Asinas (Ret.) of Catubig, Northern Samar.  It was in his term that the Our Lady of the Miraculous Medal Chapel (which houses the university chaplain) and the UEP Centre for Culture and Pageantry (commonly known as the RAB Amphitheatre) were founded. When he retired on March 4, 1963, Prof. Toribio G. Sorio of Bobon, Northern Samar, Executive Vice President, took over as officer-in-charge until SIT became a university.

In response to the pressing need for manpower development necessary for the upliftment of the socio-economic condition of the service area, House Bill 4050, sponsored by Congressman Eladio T. Balite, was signed by President Diosdado Macapagal on June 20, 1964, converting SIT into the University of Eastern Philippines. UEP is mandated to "primarily give technical and professional training, advanced instruction in literature, philosophy, the sciences and the arts, besides providing for the promotion of scientific and technological researches." The elevation of the school to a university status has, in fact, paved the way towards dramatic increase in its academic, research, and extension programs as well as the creation of additional colleges, institutes, centers, and offices.

UEP's first president was Dr. Narciso N. Pepito of Cebu who assumed office on January 24, 1966. The Veterinary Medicine Building, Science Building, extensions of the Farm Shop and Machinery Building, the Brackish Water fishpond, former College of Education Building, and the University Research Center were among the completed projects prior to President Pepito's retirement in May 1976.

Before Pres. Pepito's successor was named, the Head Executive Assistant, Atty Sergio Gelera Sr. of Catarman, World War II hero of Calbayog, became the OIC.  He was responsible for opening graduate programs.

From November 1977-November 1983, Dr. Aurora Balite Merida, of Bobon, Northern Samar was appointed as the second president. Her time was when the Australians descended upon Samar for the Northern Samar Integrated Rural Development Project (NSIRDP) and linkages with outside agencies took the form of allowing hectares of lands for the NSIRDP's and these agencies’ use.

Between the end of President Merida's term and the appointment of the next president, the CBA Dean, Dr. Gerardo Delorino, became the OIC.

In 1985, Dr. Andres F. Celestino, by birth from Nueva Ecija but a Samareño at heart because of marriage and residence, became the 3rd UEP President.  A diploma graduate (With Distinction) of the University of Reading, England, he spent more time supervising classes, projects, and construction works.  His one consuming, overriding passion: real high quality education informed by research, effective teachers and selective admission and retention.

He put up the Institute for Agricultural and Rural Development (IARD), the NSIRDP-ADAB-founded NORSARC, and the UEP Research and Development Foundation with the research grants from the IDRC, Canada; PCMARD and PhilRice.  He applied for UEP's membership in the Association of Asian Agricultural Colleges and Universities (AAACU).

Towards the end of the project, the NSIRDP equipped the Crop and Livestock Diagnostic Laboratory with sophisticated scientific equipment for the Biology Laboratory.  The NSIRDP, too, turned over its duck dispersal program and the residences of the Australian nationals to the school.

When President Celestino was gunned down in office on April 5, 1990, Dr. Leonor A. Ong Sotto, then Vice President for Academic Affairs, took over UEP's helm.

On November 15, 1990, Dr.Pedro D. Destura a UEP and UPLB alumnus from Urdaneta, Lavezares, Northern Samar became its 4th President.

With President Destura's win-win solutions to problems, he succeeded in enhancing UEP's educational opportunities and in reinvigorating the university's Faculty Development Program, which gave rise to a number of PhDs and MAs.

UEP became a Learning Center for the UP Open University, the Regional Science Teaching Center (RSTC) for the non-science and non-mathematics teachers in the elementary and high schools in Region VIII for the Department of Science and Technology (DOST), and the DOE's extension arm in the promotion, development and utilization of new and renewable energy technologies and systems in Eastern Visayas via the UEP Affiliated Renewable Energy Center (AREC).

In 1999 the Pedro Rebadulla Memorial Agricultural College (PRMAC) and the Laoang National Trade School (LNTS), formerly CHED-supervised institutions, were integrated into the university.  Since then, they have been operating as UEP PRMC Catubig Campus and UEP-Laoang Campus under the UEP System. After 17 years of service, Dr. Destura left UEP On February 11, 2007.

Prior to the selection of a regular successor, the Board of Regents appointed Dr. Milagros Esparrago, Chief Education Program Specialist of CHED Regional Office V, as UEP's Officer-in-Charge.

On June 15, 2007, in Tacloban City, Atty Mar P. De Asis of Catubig, Northern Samar took his oath of office as the 5th president of the university.  A Doctor of Philosophy in Educational Management, he is the second UEP alumnus to occupy the university's highest position.

Atty de Asis brings to the post his sterling achievement as dean of the College of Law for fourteen years. Under his stewardship, UEP's College of Law consistently placed among the top law schools all over the country.  His 13 years experience with the Development Bank of the Philippines and as a lawyer is paying off well in managing and operating the university.

He assumed the position at a young age of 48, but because he has the drive to excel and the discipline of working at the DBP, coupled with his natural ability to lead, he revolutionalized UEP's management. Within his first term of office, he was able to lead the university to its desired direction. He is presently serving his second term as UEP President.

The University of Eastern Philippines takes pride and honor for being the lone comprehensive and the biggest state university in the entire Eastern Visayas region, catering to the human resources and socio-economic development of its service area through the years.  As an old but dynamic institution of higher learning, it has gone through significant stages of development until it finally attained a university status and became one of the nationally known higher education institutions in the country.

On December 10, 2019, the Board of Regents (BOR) of the University of Eastern Philippines chose Dr. Cherry Ibañez Ultra as the next University President. She is professor at the College of Agriculture, Fisheries, and Natural Resources (CAFNR), Dr. Ultra holds a PhD in Agricultural Economics degree from the University of the Philippines in Los Baños. Dr. Ultra succeeds Dr. Rolando A. Delorino in the key university post. She is the university's seventh president (and second lady president).

Legal basis
UEP is mandated, through Republic Act No. 4126, to "primarily give technical and professional training, advanced instruction in literature, philosophy, the sciences and the arts, besides providing for the promotion of scientific and technological researches and democratic access to education to poor but deserving students, not only in Northern Samar, but also in other parts of the country."

Campuses and academics
UEP has campuses in three municipalities of Northern Samar, Catarman, Laoang, and Catubig. The following colleges, schools, and institutes comprise the Catarman campus:
 College of Agriculture, Fisheries and Natural Resources, which offers the BS Agriculture, BS Agricultural Education, BS Agribusiness, BS Fisheries, and BS Forestry degrees.
 College of Arts and Communication, which offers the AB major in Language and Literature Teaching, AB Political Science, AB major in Sociology, BS Criminology, BS Community Development, BS Development Communication, and BS Public Administration degrees.
 College of Business Administration, which offers the BS Accountancy, BS Business Administration major in management, BS Business Administration major in marketing, BS Business Economics, BS in Cooperatives, BS Entrepreneurship, and BS Hotel and Restaurant Management degrees.
 College of Education, which offers the Bachelor in Elementary Education (with various specializations) and Bachelor in Secondary Education (with various majors) degrees.
 College of Engineering, which offers BS Civil Engineering, BS Electrical Engineering, BS Industrial Engineering, and BS Mechanical Engineering degrees.
 College of Law, which offers the Bachelor of L'aws degree.
 College of Nursing, which offers the BS in Nursing, BS in Radiologic Technology degrees and BS Pharmacist degrees.
 College of Science, which offers BS Biology, BS Chemistry, BS Environmental Studies, BS Information Technology, BS Marine Biology, and BS Mathematics degrees.
 College of Veterinary Medicine, which offers Doctor of Veterinary Medicine and Bachelor of Science in Meat Technology degrees.
 Graduate School
 Institute of Land and Water Resources Management, which offers the BS Agricultural Engineering degree.

The Catarman campus also has laboratory schools for both elementary and secondary levels.

Accreditation
As of December 31, 2012, over forty degree programs of the University of Eastern Philippines have been accredited or submitted for accreditation to the Accrediting Agency of Chartered Colleges and Universities in the Philippines (AACCUP). These programs and their corresponding accreditation level or status are:

 Elementary Teacher Education  Level III Re-accredited
 Secondary Teacher Education	Level III Re-accredited
 Home Economics Education	Level III Re-accredited
 Elementary Teacher Education -Home Eco.	Level III Re-accredited
 Graduate: Master's (MAEd)	Qualified for Level III
 Graduate: Master's (MALL)	Qualified for Level III
 Graduate: Master's (MALT)	Qualified for Level III
 Graduate: Master's (MAT)	Qualified for Level III
 Graduate:  Master's (MPA)	Qualified for Level III
 Graduate: Doctoral (Ph.D.-Education)	Qualified for Level III
 Graduate: Master's (MBA)	Assessment on-going   to Qualify for Level III
 Arts and Social Sciences (Lang.& Lit.Teaching)	Level II Re-accredited
 Arts and Social Science (Political Science)	Level II Re-accredited
 Arts and Social Science (Sociology)	Level II Re-accredited
 Community Development	Level II Re-accredited
 Industrial Teacher Education   	Level I Accredited
 Graduate: Doctoral (DBA)	Level I Accredited
 Nursing	Level I Accredited
 Veterinary Medicine	Level I Accredited
 Agricultural Engineering	Level I Accredited
 Civil Engineering	Level I Accredited
 Mechanical Engineering	Level I Accredited
 Accountancy	Level I Accredited
 Business Administration 	Level I Accredited
 Business Economics	Level I Accredited
 Agribusiness	Level I Accredited
 Agriculture	Level I Accredited
 Environmental Studies	Level I Accredited
 Information Technology	Level I Accredited
 Marine Biology	Level I Accredited
 Science (Biology)	Level I Accredited
 Science (Chemistry)	Level I Accredited
 Science (Mathematics)	Level I Accredited
 Arts and Social Science (Public Adm.)	Level I Accredited
 Agricultural Teacher Education	Level I Accredited
 Forestry	Level I Accredited
 Fisheries	Level I Accredited
 Graduate: Master's (MM -PM)	Level I Accredited
 Graduate: Doctoral (DALL)	Level I Accredited
 Graduate: Doctoral (DPA)	Level I Accredited
 Entrepreneurship	Candidate
 Cooperatives	Candidate
 Hotel and Restaurant Management	Candidate
 Development Communication	Candidate
 Criminology	Candidate
 Meat Technology	Candidate

Affiliations
To reinforce academic-based activities, regular training programs are offered by institutes that have been established as extension arms chiefly intended for capability-building of its target clientele. For instance, the Regional Science Teaching Center has been offering short training courses in mathematics, biology, chemistry, and physics for elementary and secondary school teachers in Eastern Visayas. The Affiliated Non-conventional Energy Centre promotes non-conventional energy systems and provides training and demonstration projects in priority areas of Samar Island. The Information Technology-Electronic Data and Internet Centre provides trainings on computer literacy and internet services aimed at providing students and faculty members an unlimited source of research materials and other educational information. The Northern Samar Agro-Industrial Research and Fabrication Center, in coordination with the College of Agriculture, focuses on research and manufacture of prototype farm equipment.

Media
The university, through the College of Arts and Communication, runs the UNICEF-funded dyNS 102.9 FM radio station, commonly known Huni. The university student newspaper, The Pillar, is published monthly and is publicly available. Every college in this university has its own "student newspaper" and is also publicly available. These student newspapers are listed below:

 College of Arts and Communication - The Spectrum
 College of Business Administration - The Circular
 College of Education - The Accents
 College of Engineering- The Blueprint
 College of Science - The MODEM
 College of Veterinary Medicine - The Veterinary Gazette
 College of Nursing and Allied Health Sciences - The Echoes
 College of Agriculture, Fisheries and Natural Resources - Agritrends

References 

Universities and colleges in Northern Samar
State universities and colleges in the Philippines
Philippine Association of State Universities and Colleges
Catarman, Northern Samar
Educational institutions established in 1918
1918 establishments in the Philippines